The women's openweight competition at the 2002 Asian Games in Busan, South Korea was held on 3 October at the Gudeok Gymnasium with nine competitors from nine different countries.

Tong Wen of China won the gold medal.

Schedule
All times are Korea Standard Time (UTC+09:00)

Results

Main bracket

Repechage

References
2002 Asian Games Report, Page 471

External links
 
 Official website

W999
Judo at the Asian Games Women's Openweight
Asian W999